Kadhal Vaaganam is a 1968 Indian Tamil-language film directed by M. A. Thirumugam. The film stars M. G. Ramachandran, J. Jayalalithaa and S. A. Ashokan. It was released on 21 October 1968, Diwali day.

Plot 

Between Kuala Lumpur and Madras, a caravan becomes the stake of greed.

Cast 
Male cast
 M. G. Ramachandran as Sundharam
 Nagesh as Chellappin
 R. S. Manohar as Kala's husband
 S. A. Ashokan as Marimuthu
 Major Sundarrajan as Pandjachalam
 O. A. K. Thevar as The chief
 Typist Gopu as
 Sandow M. M. A. Chinnappa Thevar as a goon

Female cast
 J. Jayalalithaa as Vanidha
 Vijaya Lalitha as Fancy
 Manorama as Kokila
 C. K. Saraswathi as Mangalam
 Seethalakshmi as Kala's mother
 Chandrakantha (Guest-star)
 R Vasanthkumar as Family Doctor

Production 
Ramachandran dressed in drag for filming the song "Enna Man Ponnu Naan". His costume was designed by M. A. Muthu.

Soundtrack 
The music was composed by K. V. Mahadevan.

References

External links 
 

1960s Tamil-language films
1968 films
Cross-dressing in Indian films
Films directed by M. A. Thirumugam
Films scored by K. V. Mahadevan